The Woodman Road Historic District of South Hampton, New Hampshire, is a small rural residential historic district consisting of two houses on either side of Woodman Road, a short way north of the state line between New Hampshire and Massachusetts.  The Cornwell House, on the west side of the road, is a Greek Revival wood-frame house built c. 1850.  Nearly opposite stands the c. 1830 Verge or Woodman House, which is known to have been used as a meeting place for a congregation of Free Will Baptists between 1830 and 1849.

The district was listed on the National Register of Historic Places in 1983.

Cornwell House
The Cornwell House is a -story wood-frame structure, set on a rise overlooking the road.  It has a front-facing gable roof and clapboarded exterior.  Its main facade is three bays wide, with the entrance set in a recess in the right bay.  The building corners are pilastered, and the roof gable exhibits paired Italianate brackets.  A three-season porch is set on the right side, and a pair of ells extend to the rear, connecting to a modern garage.

Verge House
The Verge House is also a -story wood-frame structure, and is set facing south nearer the road than the Cornwell House. It is three bays wide, with a side-gable roof and shingled exterior. A single-story shed-roof section projects along the width of the main facade, with the entrance recessed under a porch in the leftmost section.

See also
National Register of Historic Places listings in Rockingham County, New Hampshire

References

Greek Revival church buildings in New Hampshire
Greek Revival houses in New Hampshire
Buildings and structures completed in 1830
Historic districts in Rockingham County, New Hampshire
Historic districts on the National Register of Historic Places in New Hampshire
1830 establishments in New Hampshire
National Register of Historic Places in Rockingham County, New Hampshire
South Hampton, New Hampshire